Émile Louis Mayade (21 August 1853 – 18 September 1898) (sometimes misspelled Mayard) was a French motoring pioneer and racing driver. He drove a Panhard et Levassor in the world's first 'city to city' motoring contest from Paris to Rouen in 1894 and went on win the world's first open motor race, the 1896 Paris–Marseille–Paris, where the first driver across the line was the winner.

Biography
Émile Mayade was born in Clermont-Ferrand in 1853 and by the 1890s was working as 'Chef d'Atelier' at Levassor in Paris, looking after the workshop and machinery, plus participating in the development of the cars. He was married to Jeanne Marie Louise Dussutour of Tarbes and they lived above the Levassor workshop in the 'Avenue d'Ivry' in the 13th arrondissement of Paris.

Racing

Mayade drove a Panhard et Levassor Phaeton 8 hp in the world's first motoring event from Paris to Rouen in 1894 where he finished seventh after eight hours and nine minutes. 
In 1895 he finished sixth in the Paris–Bordeaux–Paris race after 72 hours 14 minutes.

His greatest success was the victory in the 1896 Paris–Marseille–Paris where he won three stages and finished in 67 hours 42 minutes 58 seconds, almost 30 minutes ahead of Merkel in another Panhard et Levassor 8 hp. The Panhard had been extensively upgraded for 1896, using their first four-cylinder engine which provided double the horsepower of the 1895 model. It was equipped with tiller steering and candle lamps. The brakes were a spoon-lever pressing on the solid rubber back tyre plus a belt that tightened onto a drum on the transmission. This was the same vehicle in which Émile Levassor had won 2 of the first three stages before suffering what would become fatal injury during stage 4.

On 14 November 1896 he finished 6th (or poss. 4th) in the inaugural London to Brighton Veteran Car Run (Emancipation Day Run) to celebrate the Emancipation of British motorists and the repeal of the Red Flag Act. The car was subsequently sold to Charles Rolls for £1,200.

In July 1897 Mayade drove a Panhard in the Paris-Dieppe race which was won by the Marquis Jules-Albert de Dion in a de Dion 20 hp steamer.

Death
Mayade died in 1898 in Chevanceaux, Charente-Maritime, after a traffic accident with a runaway horse and cart that caused him to be thrown from his car and crushed.

References

External links
 European Motoring Museum, Drawing of the 1894 Panhard & Levassor, number 64 driven by Émile Mayade, equipped with "four-poster" draperies.

1853 births
1898 deaths
Sportspeople from Clermont-Ferrand
French racing drivers
Grand Prix drivers
Road incident deaths in France
Sportspeople from Puy-de-Dôme